Bjarte Tjøstheim (born 26 July 1967) is a Norwegian comedian, radio host and actor. He is best known for his appearance as sidekick in the popular Norwegian radio show Radioresepsjonen, which has been running on NRK since 2006.

In 2014 he was awarded "Norway's funniest man".

References

External links

1984 births
Living people
Norwegian male film actors
Norwegian male television actors
Norwegian radio presenters
Norwegian male comedians
People from Kristiansand